Robert Camelot (20 Mai 1903 in Reims – 4 November 1992 in Paris) was a French architect.

1903 births
1992 deaths
Architects from Reims
20th-century French architects
Prix de Rome for architecture